The untitled The Exorcist film is an upcoming American supernatural horror film directed by David Gordon Green, with a screenplay he co-wrote with Peter Sattler, from a story he co-authored with Scott Teems and Danny McBride. It stars Leslie Odom Jr., Ellen Burstyn, Ann Dowd and Jennifer Nettles.

The film is part of the franchise based on the 1971 novel of the same name by William Peter Blatty, and will serve as a direct sequel to William Friedkin's 1973 film adaptation. While the film will retroactively affect continuity of the franchise, all of the previous installments will still remain canon to its premise. It is intended to be the first of three new Exorcist films and the sixth installment of The Exorcist franchise overall.

The film is scheduled to be released by Universal Pictures on October 13, 2023.

Synopsis 
The father of a possessed child, desperate for help goes in search of someone who has had similar experiences, Chris MacNeil.

Cast 
 Leslie Odom Jr.
 Ellen Burstyn as Chris MacNeil
 Ann Dowd 
 Lidya Jewett
 Olivia Marcum
 Raphael Sbarge
 Jennifer Nettles
 Okwui Okpokwasili

Production

Development 
In August 2020, it was reported that Morgan Creek Entertainment would be producing a new installment in The Exorcist franchise, as a reboot. A tentative theatrical release window of 2021 was planned by the studio. Ben Pearson of Slash Film noted that the studio had previously stated that it would "never attempt to remake The Exorcist" but that it would also obtain the "blessings of their library titles' original creators before they move forward with new entries". 

In December 2020, it was clarified that the project in development would be a direct-sequel and follow-up to the original film, with David Gordon Green in early negotiations to serve as director. Jason Blum, David Robinson, and James Robinson serve as producers. In July 2021, it was reported that a trilogy of sequels were concurrently in development with Green hired to direct the first of the new installments, from a script he co-wrote with Peter Sattler, from an original story he co-wrote with Scott Teems and Danny McBride. Green, McBride, Couper Samuelson and Stephanie Allain serve as executive producers. Prior to acquiring the series' rights from Morgan Creek Entertainment, the writing team and Blum spent early 2020 devising the story over Zoom.

The projects are joint-venture productions between Blumhouse Productions and Morgan Creek Entertainment with Universal Pictures distributing. Universal collaborated with Peacock to purchase distribution rights for $400 million total. Parts two and three of the trilogy were optioned as potential Peacock exclusive films. By October 2021, Green expressed his intentions to direct all three films, with script outlines completed for the latter two films that he co-wrote with Sattler.
.

Casting 
Ellen Burstyn reprised her role as Chris MacNeil from the original film, with Leslie Odom Jr. co-starring a father of a possessed child who tracks down Chris. Ann Dowd, Lidya Jewett, Olivia Marcum and Okwui Okpokwasili have undisclosed roles. Raphael Sbarge joined the cast as a pastor. Jennifer Nettles has a "primary role" in the film.

Filming 
In early 2022, Burstyn stated that she had completed production for her part in the film. Though Green had previously stated that he would begin work on the sequel after completing Halloween Ends, given the actress's age and the risks of the COVID-19 pandemic, the production team worked with Burstyn to make sure they have her part completed for the film.

Principal photography began in November 2022, in Atlanta and Savannah, Georgia. Burstyn was brought in that month for reshoots.  In mid-December, production was shut down early for the holidays after Leslie Odom Jr. suffered an "unspecified health issue". Filming wrapped in early March 2023.

Release 
The untitled sequel to The Exorcist is set to be released by Universal Pictures on October 13, 2023.

Future 
In July 2021, two sequels were confirmed to be in development with the same creative team of Green, McBride, Sattler, and Teems on board.

References

External links
 

2023 films
2023 horror films
2020s English-language films
2020s supernatural horror films
American sequel films
American supernatural horror films
Blumhouse Productions films
Demons in film
The Exorcist films
Films about exorcism
Films directed by David Gordon Green
Films produced by Jason Blum
Films impacted by the COVID-19 pandemic
Morgan Creek Productions films
Religious horror films
Supernatural drama films
Universal Pictures films
Upcoming sequel films
Works by Scott Teems
2020s American films
Alternative sequel films